Paracharnia is a reassessed genus of a fossil reported by Ding and Chen (1981). It is the first Ediacaran metazoan fossilized remains found in China, taken from the Shibantan Member, Dengying Formation, Sinian System in the Eastern Yangtze Gorge, Hubei Province. It was initially classified as  Charnia dengyingensis, but Sun Weiguo in 1986, comparing this to findings from Charnwood in England and the Ediacara assemblage of South Australia, identified it as a new genera. Paracharnia is a pennatulid within the taxon of Rangeomorpha. It is closely associated with macroscopic algal remains of Vendotaenia and dense Cambrian shelly fossil deposits, suggesting its paleontological relevance.

The original fossil extraction from Ding and Chen (1981) is notable for its distinction from the original Charnia from Ford (1958) due to the arrangement of each of its polyp leaves and the length of the penduncle. Each polyp leaf in the 1981 recovery is smaller and farther out on the stem. With the addition of Paracharnia there will be ten genera in the Rangeomorph taxon.

References 

Charniidae
Fossils of China